Alexandra Louis (born 17 September 1983) is a French lawyer and politician of La République En Marche! (LREM) who served as the member of the National Assembly from 2017 to 2022, representing the 3rd constituency of the Bouches-du-Rhône department.

Political career
In parliament, Louis served as member of the Committee on Legal Affairs. In that capacity, she drafted 2021 legislation that would effectively criminalize incest and strengthen the criminalization of sexual relationships between an adult and a minor under the age of 15. In addition to her committee assignments, she was part of the parliamentary friendship groups with Madagascar and the Comores.

In addition to her parliamentary work, Louis was a member of the French delegation to the Parliamentary Assembly of the Council of Europe from 2017 to 2022. In this capacity, she served on the Committee on Legal Affairs and Human Rights; the Committee on the Honouring of Obligations and Commitments by Member States of the Council of Europe (Monitoring Committee); and the Sub-Committee on Human Rights. She was also the Assembly's rapporteur on the situation of human rights defenders in the region.

In the 2022 French legislative election Louis lost his seat after being eliminated in the first round.

Political positions
In July 2019, Louis voted in favour of the French ratification of the European Union’s Comprehensive Economic and Trade Agreement (CETA) with Canada.

References

Living people
Politicians from Marseille
Deputies of the 15th National Assembly of the French Fifth Republic
Women members of the National Assembly (France)
21st-century French lawyers
La République En Marche! politicians
21st-century French women politicians
1983 births
Members of Parliament for Bouches-du-Rhône